Mornac-sur-Seudre (literally Mornac on Seudre) is a commune in the Charente-Maritime department in southwestern France.

Population

See also
Communes of the Charente-Maritime department

References

External links
 

Communes of Charente-Maritime
Plus Beaux Villages de France
Charente-Maritime communes articles needing translation from French Wikipedia